Vasile Voiculescu (literary pseudonym V. Voiculescu; 27 November 1884 – 26 April 1963) was a Romanian poet, short-story writer, playwright, and physician.

Biography

Early life and education
Voiculescu was born in Pârscov, Buzău County, Romania, to a family of wealthy peasants. He attended primary school in Pleșcoi, a village near his home, for a year, after which he was sent to a boarding school in Buzău. He attended high school in Buzău, then in Bucharest — the Gheorghe Lazăr High School, where he befriended George Ciprian, an aspiring actor at that time, and the young writer Urmuz.

Upon graduating from high school in 1902, he read philosophy for a year at the University of Bucharest before starting his medical studies at the Faculty of Medicine. He became a doctor of medicine in 1910.

Prominence
March 1912 marked Voiculescu's debut as a poet with Dor ("Longing"), a poem first published in Convorbiri Literare. He managed to publish a volume of poems in 1916, but the German Empire forces occupying Bucharest (see Romanian Campaign (World War I)) destroyed all copies. In 1918, he published the volume Din țara zimbrului ("From the Land of the Wisent").

Between the two world wars, he lived in Bucharest and held a series of public conferences on medicine, broadcast on radio and aimed primarily at peasant audiences. He wrote poetry of religious persuasion, themed around the birth of Christ, Magi, and Crucifixion. His literary style gradually became Expressionistic.

Voiculescu published several short stories, such as Capul de zimbru ("Wisent Head"); novels, such as Zahei orbul ("Zahei the Blind"), and plays: Duhul pământului ("Earth's Ghost"), Demiurgul ("The Demiurge"), Gimnastică sentimentală ("Sentimental Gymnastics"), Pribeaga ("The Wanderer").

Imprisonment and release
After World War II, Romanian communist authorities attacked and persecuted Voiculescu for his religious and democratic ideals, and did not allow him to publish. He was imprisoned in 1958, at the age of 74, and he spent the following four years in prison; he became ill during detention, dying of cancer a few months after his release.

His final work, Shakespeare's Last Imagined Sonnets in the Imaginary Translation of..., comprises 90 sonnets, written between 1954 and 1958. An intricate portrayal of love in all its glory, it was published after his death.

In 1990, he was posthumously elected member of the Romanian Academy. His house in Pârscov became the Vasile Voiculescu memorial house. Also, the county library in Buzău bears his name.

Works
Ultimele sonete ale lui Shakespeare/Les derniers sonnets de Shakespeare (Paralela, 2005). Bilingual Romanian-French edition of Last Imagined Sonnets.

References 

1884 births
1963 deaths
People from Buzău County
Gheorghe Lazăr National College (Bucharest) alumni
University of Bucharest alumni
Carol Davila University of Medicine and Pharmacy alumni
20th-century Romanian poets
Romanian male poets
Romanian male short story writers
Romanian short story writers
Male dramatists and playwrights
20th-century Romanian dramatists and playwrights
20th-century short story writers
20th-century Romanian male writers
20th-century Romanian physicians
Expressionist writers
Sonneteers
Censorship in Romania
Members of the Romanian Orthodox Church
Members of the Romanian Academy of Sciences
Members of the Romanian Academy elected posthumously
Deaths from cancer in Romania